2 Squadron may refer to:

Air force units 
 No. 2 Squadron RAAF, Australia
 No. 2 Security Forces Squadron RAAF, Australia
 No. 2 Squadron RCAF, Canada
 No. 2 Squadron IAF, India
 2nd Squadron (Iraq)
 2nd Squadron (JASDF), Japan
 No. 2 Squadron RJAF, Jordan
 No. 2 Squadron RNZAF, New Zealand
 No. 2 Squadron PAF, Pakistan
 2 Squadron SAAF, South Africa
 No. 2 Squadron SLAF, Sri Lanka
 No. 2 Squadron RAF, United Kingdom
 No. 2 Squadron RFC, which became No. 2 Squadron RAF in 1918
 No. II Squadron RAF Regiment, United Kingdom
 2d Airborne Command and Control Squadron, United States
 2nd Airlift Squadron, United States
 2nd Air Refueling Squadron, United States
 2d Air Rescue Squadron, United States
 2d Air Support Operations Squadron, United States
 2d Aeromedical Evacuation Squadron, United States
 2d Antisubmarine Squadron, United States
 2d Bombardment Squadron, United States
 2d Command and Control Squadron, United States
 2nd Fighter Squadron, United States
 2d Fighter Squadron (Commando), United States
 2d Reconnaissance Squadron (disambiguation), several units of the United States
 2d Space Launch Squadron, United States
 2d Space Operations Squadron, United States
 2nd Special Operations Squadron, United States
 2d Systems Operations Squadron, United States

Naval units 
 2nd Battle Squadron, United Kingdom
 2nd Frigate Squadron (United Kingdom)
 2nd Battlecruiser Squadron, United Kingdom